The 2020 Réunion Premier League is the 71st season of the Réunion Premier League, the professional league for association football clubs in Réunion, since the league's establishment in 1950. The season started on 19 July 2020.

League table

Results

Top scorers

References

External links
LRDF

Football competitions in Réunion
Premier League
Reunion